Facheiroa ulei is a species of plant in the family Cactaceae.

It is endemic to Brazil, and occurs in northern Bahia east of the San Francisco River, at elevations of 400 to 950 m.

Its natural habitats are rocky areas and hot tropic desert scrub.

References

ulei
Cacti of South America
Endemic flora of Brazil
Flora of Bahia
Data deficient plants
Least concern biota of South America
Taxonomy articles created by Polbot